Night Friend is a Canadian drama film, directed by Peter Gerretsen and released in 1987. The film stars Chuck Shamata as Fr. Jack Donnell, a Roman Catholic priest who encounters a teen prostitute named Lindsay (Heather Kjollesdal), and tries to save her from life on the streets.

The cast also includes Daniel MacIvor as Lindsay's boyfriend Lenny, Jayne Eastwood as a bag lady, and Art Carney as the monsignor.

Eastwood received a Genie Award nomination for Best Supporting Actress at the 9th Genie Awards.

References

External links

1987 films
Canadian drama films
English-language Canadian films
1980s English-language films
1980s Canadian films